The Communauté d'agglomération de Marne et Gondoire is a communauté d'agglomération, an intercommunal structure, part of the Marne-la-Vallée new town, in the eastern suburbs of Paris. It is located in the Seine-et-Marne department, in the Île-de-France region, northern France. It was created in November 2001. In July 2017, it was expanded with the communes Ferrières-en-Brie and Pontcarré. Its seat is in Bussy-Saint-Martin. Its area is 105.0 km2. Its population was 106,750 in 2018.

Composition
The communauté d'agglomération consists of the following 20 communes:
 
Bussy-Saint-Georges
Bussy-Saint-Martin
Carnetin
Chalifert
Chanteloup-en-Brie
Collégien
Conches-sur-Gondoire
Dampmart
Ferrières-en-Brie
Gouvernes
Guermantes
Jablines
Jossigny
Lagny-sur-Marne
Lesches
Montévrain
Pomponne
Pontcarré
Saint-Thibault-des-Vignes
Thorigny-sur-Marne

See also
Communes of the Seine-et-Marne department

References

Intercommunalities of Seine-et-Marne
Agglomeration communities in France